Lawrence "Lorry" Greenberg (31 December 1933 – 30 June 1999) was Mayor of Ottawa, Ontario from 1975 to 1978.

He graduated from Lisgar Collegiate in 1952. He was one of the founding members of Minto Developments Inc., but left the company in 1963.

Greenberg first ran for a seat on Ottawa City Council in 1966 in Wellington Ward, but finished fourth in the two seat ward. However, he was appointed by council to fill the seat on April 22, 1968 (effective May 1), following the death of Lionel O'Connor. The third place finisher in the 1966 election had since died. His appointment was backed by the Bank Street and Elgin Street merchant associations. He was elected by council on the eighth ballot, defeating businessman Leonard Baker, Mathew McGrath, and former aldermen Don Armstrong and Cecile O'Regan. Greenberg was elected to the city's Board of Control in the 1969 municipal elections, and as the city's mayor in 1974.

While mayor, Greenberg was a proponent of community-based planning.

Despite his wealth, he was a reformer. As mayor, he ran a campaign against body rub parlours, and an anti-smoking by-law. Following his term as mayor, he became an antique dealer.  He was rumoured to be a candidate for the federal Liberals for Ottawa Centre in the 1979 Canadian federal election, but decided against the idea.

He died of heart failure in 1999 at the Ottawa Heart Institute, aged 65.

References

 
 
 

1933 births
1999 deaths
Businesspeople from Ottawa
Mayors of Ottawa
Ottawa controllers
Canadian company founders
Real estate company founders
Real estate and property developers
Canadian construction businesspeople
Lisgar Collegiate Institute alumni
Jewish mayors of places in Canada